Tinghir (Tamazight: ⵜⵉⵏⵖⵉⵔ), sometimes known as Tinerhir, is a city in the region of Drâa-Tafilalet, south of the High Atlas and north of the Little Atlas in central Morocco. It is the capital of Tinghir Province.
Its name originally referred to the foothills of the Atlas Mountains, but its area has expanded to encompass surrounding villages and refers to the entire oasis.

The city of Tinghir (jamaate tinghir) has a population of 42,044 and the province has 322,412 inhabitants, according to the 2014 census. The predominant ethnic group is Amazighs, and the city is at the center of one of the most attractive oases in southern Morocco.
The palm oasis, dense and widespread, is irrigated by a network of pipes and irrigation canals. Occasional heavy rains are absorbed in a few days.

Economy
The economy of Tinghir is based on agriculture, trade and tourism. In addition, many families live on money sent home by relatives working in Europe.
Social and cultural activities are increasing; education projects for young children are increasing in many villages, as well as literacy projects aimed at adults (particularly women). These projects are supported by local and nongovernmental organisations.

Geography 

The climate is arid subtropical: hot, dry winters in relation to altitude. There are a few rainy days per year, with the greatest precipitation in fall and winter.

The road from Ouarzazate to Imtghren parallels the mountains.
During the Mesozoic the region was invaded by the sea, where thick deposits of sediments rich in marine fossils (particularly of the ammonitida class). The uplift of the Atlas Mountains (primarily during the Neogene) caused the withdrawal of the sea and the deformation of rocks into folds and faults.
Wind and river erosion eventually shaped the desert landscape of limestone and clay.
The river widens, developing an oasis edged with the red ochre of the desert.

Government

King Mohammed VI gave his approval on 21 January 2009 to make Tinghir an administrative center, an initiative which met the needs of its inhabitants; it provides a legal and institutional framework for reform of territorial administration based on good governance and local self-administration.

External links 

Oases of Morocco
Populated places in Tinghir Province
Tinghir
Morocco geography articles needing translation from French Wikipedia